WOSP can refer to:

 Wielka Orkiestra Świątecznej Pomocy, or Great Orchestra of Christmas Charity
 WOSP (FM), an FM radio station licensed to Portsmouth, Ohio
 World Series of Poker, the largest set of poker tournaments in the world